Strupin Duży  is a village in the administrative district of Gmina Chełm, within Chełm County, Lublin Voivodeship, in eastern Poland.

References

Villages in Chełm County